The Adventures of Jim Bowie is an American Western television series that aired on ABC from 1956 to 1958. Its setting was the 1830s-era Louisiana Territory. The series was an adaptation of the book Tempered Blade, by Monte Barrett.

Synopsis
The series stars Scott Forbes as the real-life adventurer Jim Bowie.  The series initially portrayed Jim Bowie as something of an outdoors-man, riding his horse through the wilderness near his home in Opelousas, where he would stumble across someone needing his assistance. He was aided by the Bowie Knife, his ever-present weapon. He designed it in the first episode, The Birth of the Blade.  Although Bowie used the blade quite a bit in early episodes, its prominence was downplayed as the show went on.

Gradually the series shifted from the country to the city, having Bowie instead spend the majority of his time in New Orleans.  He was frequently shown looking to invest his money in real estate, or coming to the aid of someone who had been swindled.

Storylines focused on the exploits of Bowie before he moved to Texas (then part of Mexico), and his death at the Alamo in 1836. During the series's two season run, Bowie encountered many historical figures of the era, such as President Andrew Jackson, Jefferson Davis, John James Audubon, Sam Houston, and Davy Crockett.

Production 
Among the actors and actresses who guest-starred more than once on the series were William Schallert, Denver Pyle, Michael Landon, Chuck Connors, Walter Coy, June Carter Cash, and Lurene Tuttle. Jimmy Noel made walk-on appearances in six episodes. Those making single guest appearances included Yvonne Lime Fedderson, Douglas Kennedy, and Carole Mathews.

Jim Bowie did not appear in the last episode of the series.  Instead, he was said to be away on an important assignment, and the attention was placed on criminal Jess Miller.  Miller was given the task to retrieve a great sum of money, and the episode focused on whether Miller would complete his assignment or take the money for himself.  At the end there is an indication that Miller would join up with Bowie on further adventures, but no further episodes were produced.

Douglas Brode wrote in his book, Shooting Stars of the Small Screen: Encyclopedia of TV Western Actors, 1946–Present, that Scott Forbes, who had the title role, "stormed off the set" when he learned that the series was being canceled after two seasons, when he had understood that it would run for five seasons. He added, "In desperation, the writers fashioned the final script" without the star.

The program was sponsored by Chesebrough-Ponds.

Reception 
Use of the knife in the initial episode led a reviewer for The New York Times to write, "[I]t would seem like a wise idea for parents to keep young viewers away from the television set when the show is on." The show was one of the first TV programs criticized for on-screen violence.

Episodes

Season 1 (1956-57)

Season 2 (1957-58)

Theme Music
The theme song was "Adventurin' Man", performed by the Ken Darby Singers. The series' music was unusual in that it was primarily vocal, provided by Ken Darby and The King's Men (save for a few episodes in season two).

Recurring cast members
 
Scott Forbes - Jim Bowie (75 episodes)
Peter Hansen - Rezin Bowie (17 episodes)
Minerva Urecal - Ma Bowie (6 episodes)
William Schallert - Justinian Tebbs (8 episodes)
Denver Pyle - Sam Houston (3 episodes)
Ewing Mitchell - Preacher Homer Wilkins (2 episodes)

Home media
A two-DVD set containing 13 episodes of the program has been published.

Merchandising

The TV show was also adapted into a comic book by Dan Spiegle, distributed by Dell Comics.

References

Sources
Tim Brooks & Earle Marsh, The Complete Directory to Prime Time Network and Cable TV Shows (7th ed. 1999), pp. 14–15.

External links
 
 

1956 American television series debuts
1958 American television series endings
American Broadcasting Company original programming
Black-and-white American television shows
English-language television shows
Cultural depictions of American men
Cultural depictions of explorers
Television series by Desilu Productions
Television series set in the 1830s
Television shows set in New Orleans
1950s Western (genre) television series
American folklore films and television series
Television shows adapted into comics
Cultural depictions of James Bowie